The Kaikō Maru (海幸丸; now SVS Frobisher) was the spotter ship for the Japanese whaling fleet. In 2007, it collided with the Sea Shepherd Conservation Society vessel MY Robert Hunter and was disabled. It sent out a mayday (call for help) and  the Robert Hunter, Farley Mowat, and the Esperanza were obliged to respond until the Kaiko Maru was repaired.

It was sold in 2013 to Specialised Vessel Services as a patrol vessel and renamed as SVS Frobisher.

References

Whaling ships
Whaling in Japan
1972 ships
Ships built in Japan